The 2016–17 season is the Al-Shabab Football Club's 70th season in existence and 38th consecutive season in Pro League, the top flight of Saudi Arabian football. Along with Pro League, Al-Shabab also competed in the Crown Prince Cup and King Cup.

Players

Squad information

Transfers

In

Out

On loan

Pre-season and friendlies

Competitions

Overall

Last Updated: 25 October 2016

Pro League

League table

Results summary

Results by round

Matches
All times are local, AST (UTC+3).

Crown Prince Cup

All times are local, AST (UTC+3).

King Cup

Statistics

Goalscorers

Last Updated: 25 October 2016

Clean sheets

Last Updated: 25 October 2016

References

Al Shabab FC (Riyadh) seasons
Shabab